Thomas or Tom Palmer may refer to:

Politicians
 Thomas Palmer (Mayor of York) (c. 1219) on list of mayors of York
 Thomas Palmer, in 1433, MP for Leicestershire
 Thomas Palmer (MP for Rutland), in 1450, MP for Rutland
 Thomas Palmer (died 1553), soldier and courtier
 Thomas Palmer (died 1582), MP for Sussex, Guildford and Arundel
 Sir Thomas Palmer, 1st Baronet (1540–1626), "The Travailer"
 Thomas Palmer (1542 – by 1616), MP for Sussex
 Thomas Palmer (died 1735), British Member of Parliament (MP) for Bridgewater
 Sir Thomas Palmer, 4th Baronet, of Wingham (1682–1723), MP for Kent 1708–1710 and for Rochester 1715–1724
 Sir Thomas Palmer, 4th Baronet, of Carlton (1702–1765), MP for Leicestershire 1754–1765
 Thomas W. Palmer (1830–1913), U.S. Senator from the state of Michigan
Thomas Palmer (Florida politician) (1859–1946), lawyer and politician in Florida

Others
 Sir Thomas Palmer (died 1553), executed English soldier
 Thomas Fyshe Palmer (1747–1802), Unitarian minister and political reformer
 Tom Palmer (actor), American television actor particularly active in the 1960s, see "It Crawled Out of the Woodwork"
 Tom Palmer (animator), American animator
 Tom Palmer (comics) (1942–2022), comic book illustrator
 Tom Palmer (comedian), British comedian and actor
 Tom Palmer (rugby union) (born 1979), English rugby player
 Tom Palmer (writer), American television writer
 Tom G. Palmer (born 1956), libertarian commentator and fellow of the Cato Institute
 Tony Andruzzi (1925–1991), magician who sometimes performed as Tom Palmer
 Thomas Palmer (cyclist) (born 1990), Australian cyclist
 Thomas Palmer (burgess), English immigrant to colonial Virginia